Scott MacLeod (born 3 March 1979 in Hawick) is a retired Scottish rugby union footballer. He last played as a lock for Newcastle Falcons. He is currently still an active part of that club, in a coaching role. Having retired from playing at the end of the 2016–16 season.

MacLeod was introduced to rugby at the age of 21, having previously been a keen golfer and basketball player. He joined Hawick Trades before going on to play for Hawick RFC, with whom he won the BT Cellnet Cup in 2002 and from whom he joined The Borders professional team when it was set up that year. MacLeod represented the Borders at under-21 level, but left the Border Reivers to join Llanelli Scarlets for the 2006–07 season and made his debut for the West Wales team on a visit to Ulster on the opening weekend of the Magners League. He returned to Scottish rugby in January 2008 by signing for Edinburgh.

MacLeod made his debut for the national side on 6 November 2004, in a match against Australia, and has received 24 caps in total, 15 as a substitute. MacLeod was in the Scotland squad for the 2007 Rugby World Cup, where he made five appearances (four as a substitute).

On the morning of 25 February 2008, MacLeod was announced to have tested positive for banned substance terbutaline, only to be retrospectively cleared a few hours later after it was revealed to be nothing more than an administrative error. It was also announced later in the year that he had failed a doping test due to unusually high testosterone levels. He was later cleared as the rise in testosterone was due to a large amount of alcohol being consumed by the player the night before the test to celebrate the birth of his first child.

MacLeod was released by the Scarlets by mutual consent on 29 January 2009. He then signed for Edinburgh later that day.

In November 2010, MacLeod confirmed that he was moving to Japan. He has signed for the Kobe Kobelco Steelers for their upcoming 2011–12 Top League campaign.

In the 2012–13 season, Macleod signed up to play for the Newcastle Falcons.

References

External links
Newcastle Falcons Profile
Scarlets profile
Scotland profile

1979 births
Living people
Border Reivers players
British expatriates in Japan
Edinburgh Rugby players
Expatriate rugby union players in Japan
Hawick RFC players
Hawick Trades players
Kobelco Kobe Steelers players
Newcastle Falcons players
People educated at Hawick High School
Rugby union locks
Rugby union players from Hawick
Scarlets players
Scotland international rugby union players
Scottish expatriate rugby union players
Scottish rugby union players